Kamiar 'Kami’ Rokni is a Pakistani fashion designer and media personality. He is the founder of his eponymous label The House of Kamiar Rokni.

Early life 
Kamiar was born in Bahawalpur on October 15, 1976, of Pakistani and Persian descent. His father is from Iran and his mother is from Bahawalpur in South Punjab. Raised in a creative family, surrounded by culture, art, creators, and tinkerers, Kamiar started making clothes at the age of seven.

Career 
In 2008, Kamiar began hosting a show called No Reservations on Dawn News where celebrities were invited for a candid talk about their lives.

In early 2018, it was announced that Kamiar Rokni had joined Sapphire as a Design Director whilst simultaneously continuing his eponymous label.

Kamiar mentors the 'Emerging Talent' segment of the Pakistan Fashion Design Council.

Achievements
In 2008, Kamiar Rokni was nominated for a Lux Style Award in the 'Best Prêt Wear' category. In 2017, he was nominated again and this time for the category of 'Achievement in Fashion Design – Bridal'.

Two of Kamiar Rokni's designs opened the 'artist' and the 'prom queen' segments at the Lahore Grammar School Defence branch fashion show in 2008 which was held to raise funds for the Smile Again Foundation.

In 2014, Kamiar partnered with Porsche Pakistan to create a capsule collection based on the theme of Polo.

In 2016, he collaborated with L'Oréal Paris Pakistan in their Ambassador of Fashion platform by creating a capsule collection for the 'Art of Color' campaign.

Kamiar designed a custom-made dress for Meesha Shafi for the Magnum Chocolate Party of 2017 in Lahore, Pakistan. As Meesha performed her track, her dress was illuminated using projection mapping by the light artist, Umer Toor.

References 

Pakistani fashion designers
Pakistani people of Iranian descent
Living people
1976 births